Arsenobetaine is an organoarsenic compound that is the main source of arsenic found in fish. It is the arsenic analog of trimethylglycine, commonly known as betaine. The biochemistry and its biosynthesis are similar to those of choline and betaine.

Arsenobetaine is a common substance in marine biological systems and unlike many other organoarsenic compounds, such as trimethylarsine, it is relatively non-toxic. The compound may play a similar role as urea does for nitrogen, as a non-toxic waste compound made in the bodies of animals to dispose of the relevant element.

It has been known since 1920 that marine fish contain organoarsenic compounds, but it was not until 1977 that the chemical structure of the most predominant compound arsenobetaine was determined.

Safety
Whereas arsenous acid (As(OH)3) has an LD50 (mice) of 34.5 mg/kg (mice), the LD50 for the arsenobetaine exceeds 10 g/kg.

References

Further reading

Organoarsenic compounds
Zwitterions
Quaternary compounds